"Jånni Balle" is a song written by Magnus Uggla and Anders Henriksson and recorded by Uggla on his 1993 studio album Alla får påsar. The single peaked at number 25 on the Swedish Singles Chart and became the 59th most successful Trackslistan song of 1993.

Charts

References 

Svensk mediedatabas, accessdate: 14 January 2014

1993 singles
1993 songs
Magnus Uggla songs
Swedish-language songs
Songs written by Anders Henriksson (record producer)
Songs written by Magnus Uggla